Choerophryne gracilirostris is a tiny (13–15 mm long), little-studied species of frog in the family Microhylidae. It is endemic to the rainforest of the Western and Southern Highlands provinces of Papua New Guinea. Choerophryne gracilirostris can be distinguished by its long narrow snout and advertisement call of 3-5 pulsed notes in long repeated sequences. Males can be found calling from within leaf litter or rotting logs, especially on rainy nights.

References

gracilirostris
Amphibians of Papua New Guinea
Amphibians described in 2014